Washington Crossing is an unincorporated community located within Hopewell Township in Mercer County, New Jersey. It was the eastern landing point following George Washington's crossing of the Delaware River on the night of December 25–26, 1776 during the American Revolutionary War. The  Washington Crossing State Park is adjacent to the community on the western side of Washington Crossing Bridge in Washington Crossing, Pennsylvania. 

The feeder canal for the Delaware and Raritan Canal runs along the Delaware River through the community.

Demographics

Notable people

People who were born in, residents of, or otherwise closely associated with Washington Crossing include:
 William H. Blackwell (1882–1963), fruit farmer and politician.

Gallery

See also
 Washington Crossing Historic Park

References

Hopewell Township, Mercer County, New Jersey
Unincorporated communities in Mercer County, New Jersey
Unincorporated communities in New Jersey